Dependency ratios are a measure of the age structure of a population. They indicate the proportion of individuals that are likely to be economically "dependent" on the support of others. Dependency ratios relate the numbers of children (ages 0–14) and the elderly (ages 65+) to the number of adults (ages 15–64). Changes in the dependency ratio provide an indication of potential social support requirements resulting from changes in population age structures. When fertility levels decline, the dependency ratio initially falls because the proportion of children decreases while the proportion of the population of working age increases. If fertility levels continue to decline, dependency ratios eventually increase because the proportion of the population of working age starts to decline and the proportion of elderly persons continues to increase.

The total dependency ratio is the total numbers of the children (ages 0–14) and elderly (ages 65+) populations per 100 people of adults (ages 15–64). A high total dependency ratio indicates that the adult population and the overall economy face a greater burden to support and provide social services for youth and elderly persons, who are often economically dependent.

The children dependency ratio is the number of the children population (ages 0–14) per 100 people of adults (ages 15–64). A high children dependency ratio indicates that a greater investment needs to be made in schooling and other services for children.

The elderly dependency ratio is the number of the elderly population (ages 65+) per 100 people of working age (ages 15–64). Increases in the elderly dependency ratio put added pressure on governments to fund pensions and healthcare.

The potential support ratio is the number of adults (ages 15–64) per one elderly person (ages 65+). It is the reciprocal of the elderly dependency ratio. As a population ages, the potential support ratio tends to fall, meaning there are fewer potential workers to support the elderly.

List (2020) 
All data is for the year 2020. Source is the CIA World Factbook.

References 

Dependency ratio
Dependency ratio
Demographic lists